The National Sea Rescue Institute (NSRI) is a voluntary non-profit organization in South Africa tasked with saving lives through drowning prevention. It operates 41 bases (as of 2020) comprising coastal stations and inland stations on dams. There are crews on standby at all hours.  There are over 1000 volunteers equipped with sponsored rescue craft, rescue vehicles, quad bikes and tractors, supported by an operations department at the head office.

The NSRI works closely with other Search and Rescue organisations in South Africa.

History 
Following an incident  at Stilbaai near Mossel Bay on the south coast of South Africa in 1966, in which 17 fishermen drowned after three fishing boats sank in a storm, Miss Pattie Price of Simon’s Town whose own life had been saved by a RNLI lifeboat in the English Channel, wrote a series of letters to the newspapers to advocate for the formation of a sea rescue organisation in South Africa.

Captain Bob Deacon and Ray Lant were the first volunteers to respond to this call and in 1967 the South African Inshore Rescue Service (SAISRS) was started, with a 4.7m inflatable boat donated by the Society of Master Mariners. The SAISRS was later renamed to National Sea Rescue Institute (NSRI) and continues the tradition of operation by volunteers.

List of NSRI stations 

 Agulhas - Station 30, -34.798567, 20.059433
 Bakoven - Station 2, -33.960583, 18.373033 (Cape Town)
 Ballito - Station 41, -29.437578, 31.222571
 Durban - Station 5, -29.873933, 31.050767
 East London - Station 7, -33.02305, 27.8913
 Gauteng - Station 27, -26.270759, 28.112268 (inland)
 Gordon's Bay - Station 9, -34.16435, 18.859733 (Cape Town)
 Hartebeespoort Dam - Station 25, -25.730167, 27.86045 (inland)
 Hermanus - Station 17, -34.433417, 19.22515
 Hout Bay - Station 8, -34.05025, 18.345333 (Cape Town)
 Jeffrey's Bay - Station 37, -34.048333, 24.923333
 Kleinmond - Station 42, -34.335399, 19.012628
 Knysna - Station 12, -34.076083, 23.060383
 Kommetjie - Station 26, -34.140833, 18.328833 (Cape Town)
 Lambert's Bay - Starion 34, -32.090726, 18.300401
 Melkbosstrand - Station 18, -33.729, 18.4385 (Cape Town)
 Mossel Bay - Station 15, -34.180583, 22.1488
 Mykonos - Station 4, -33.047367, 18.0398
 Oyster Bay - Station 36, -34.169673, 24.653434
 Plettenberg Bay - Station 40, -34.058333, 23.378
 Port Alfred - Station 11, -33.594933, 26.89095
 Port Edward - Station 32, -31.048217, 30.231167
 Port Elizabeth - Station 6, -33.967617, 25.633567
 Port Nolloth - Station 43, -29.238409, 16.928872
 Port St Johns - Station 28, -31.530022, 29.4643592
 Richards Bay - Station 19, -28.791633, 32.08365
 Rocky Bay - Station 39, -30.334283, 30.733833
 Shelly Beach - Station 20, -30.808517, 30.412217
 Simon's Town - Station 10, -34.192283, 18.434367 (Cape Town)
 St Francis Bay - Station 21, -34.184333, 24.8523
 St Lucia - Station 40, -28.372602, 32.414163
 Still Bay - Station 21, -34.385733, 21.423917
 Strandfontein - Station 16, -34.077876, 18.573032 (Cape Town)
 Table Bay - Station 3, -33.909167, 18.423617 (Cape Town)
 Theewaterskloof - Station 38, -34.176, 19.262533 (inland)
 Vaal Dam - Station 22, -26.895867, 28.113433 (inland)
 Wilderness - Station 23, -33.9952, 22.580567
 Witbank Dam - Station 35, -25.9093, 29.308733 (inland)
 Witsand - Station 33, -34.391333, 20.837833
 Yzerfontein - Station 34, -33.346, 18.149833

Rescue craft 
The NSRI has used a wide range of rescue vessels and types of rescue vessel over the years.

RL 36, 9m deep V, Cold moulded wood: 
Pearl van Riet, Station 9 
Brede class: (RNLI design)
Spirit of Safmarine. Station 10,

Offshore Rescue Craft class 

The first vessel of the offshore rescue craft (ORC) class vessel was procured from a French boatyard in 2019 and stationed at Durban. The vessel has a 14.8m long composite hull with a 4.8 m beam, and is suitable for search and rescue operations up to 50 nautical miles offshore. The second vessel of the class was finished from an imported set of mouldings and delivered to Station 10 (Simon's Town) from Two Oceans Marine in Cape Town in April 2021. It will be kept ready to launch at a few minutes notice on a cradle in the boathouse. 

The rest of the series will be manufactured in Cape Town under license using moulds taken off the second boat's mouldings. The vessel is longitudinally subdivided into forepeak, forward accommodation for survivors, tank space with heads, engine room and steering flat. The superstructure is on the main deck and comprises a watertight wheelhouse, which provides a high centre of buoyancy for self-righting, and has a raised exterior steering position on the port side. The transom has a ladder for boarding from the water and two small platforms just above the waterline. There is a substantial towing bollard on the quarterdeck and a gap in the stern rail at the top of the ladder which also serves as a fairlead for towing lines. The crew seating includes safety belts and shock absorber mountings to mitigate vertical acceleration shock loads.

A track with sliding cars runs around the wheelhouse just below the handrail, providing secure but mobile harness clip-off points for crew working on or traversing the side decks. The handrails on the foredeck and side decks are inset to avoid damage when alongside large vessels in a seaway. There is a small but sturdy davit on the port side suitable for hoisting survivors on board, in clear view of the exterior control point.

Structure is fibre reinforced plastic composite, partly foam cored and partly solid skin with foam cored frames. Structural glass fibres are used for most of the layup, with carbon fibre stiffening where most effective. High density core material is used in heavily loaded components such as engine beds.

Specifications

Specifications:
Designation ORC 140.RS
Survivor capacity: 23/24 persons.(sources vary)
Crew 6 
Expected lifespan: 40 years.
Self righting by inherent stability when intact
Original vessel manufacture: France
Series manufacturer: Two Oceans Marine (Cape Town)
Cost per vessel: R20 million
Series cost: R180 million
Maximum speed of about 28 knots with crew, equipment and full tanks
Range of 250 nautical miles at 20 knots cruising speed with 25% reserve.
Length overall 14.8 m
Moulded length 13.85 m
Waterline length 13.56 m
Beam overall 4.8 m
Beam moulded 4.6 m
Depth 2.08 m
Draught (loaded) 1.4 m
Displacement (light) 15 900kg according to the stability book
Displacement (loaded) 
Fuel capacity 2 tanks of 1000 litres each
Engines: 2 x Cummins QSC 8.3M marine diesels producing 441 kW at ????rpm
Gearboxes: ZF 370 V, a 10° V-drive, remote mount marine transmission.
Propellers, rudders and shafts CJR 
Towing bollard rated for 4.5 tonne
Vessel sound level 76 dB 

Names and stations:
14-01, Station 5, Durban
14-02, "Donna Nicholas", Station 10, Simon's Town, April 2021
14-03,

Gallery

See also 
Similar organizations around the world
 Royal Netherlands Sea Rescue Institution
 Royal National Lifeboat Institution (Ireland and the United Kingdom)
 Société Nationale de Sauvetage en Mer (France)
 German Maritime Search and Rescue Service (Germany)
 Norsk Selskab til Skibbrudnes Redning (Norway, also called Redningsselskapet)

References

External links 
:Commons:Category:NSRI 14m offshore class rescue craft
 NSRI homepage
 The ASR, one of the 3 helicopter units of the NSRI
 NSRI Station 2 at Bakoven
 NSRI Station 8 at Hout Bay
 NSRI Station 10 Simon's Town
 NSRI Station 12 at Knysna
 NSRI Station 14 at Plettenberg Bay
 NSRI Station 15 at Mossel Bay
 NSRI Station 19 at Richards Bay
 NSRI Station 18 at Melkbosstrand
 South African Search and Rescue Organisation

Sea rescue organizations
Emergency medical services in South Africa
Maritime history of South Africa